Fu Ning Garden is a Home Ownership Scheme and Private Sector Participation Scheme court in Hang Hau, Tseung Kwan O, New Territories, Hong Kong near Hang Hau Village and Tseung Kwan O Hospital. It was jointly developed by the Hong Kong Housing Authority and Tak Wing Investment (Holdings) Limited (Renamed as New Smart Energy Group Limited), and has a total of six blocks built on reclaimed land and was completed in 1990.

Houses

Demographics
According to the 2016 by-census, Fu Ning Garden had a population of 6,934. The median age was 50 and the majority of residents (97.2 per cent) were of Chinese ethnicity. The average household size was 3 people. The median monthly household income of all households (i.e. including both economically active and inactive households) was HK$33,000.

Politics
Fu Ning Garden is located in Fu Nam constituency of the Sai Kung District Council. It is currently represented by Andrew Chan Yiu-chor, who was elected in the 2019 elections.

See also

Public housing estates in Tseung Kwan O

References

Tseung Kwan O
Hang Hau
Home Ownership Scheme
Private Sector Participation Scheme
Residential buildings completed in 1990